The Amherst Center for Russian Culture was created by Amherst College in Amherst, Massachusetts after the gift of a major collection of Russian books, manuscripts, periodicals and ephemera by Thomas P. Whitney in 1991.  The Center has a particularly strong collection of works by and relating to Russian emigres.  Subsequent major gifts of material have come from Dmitri Tarasenkov and George Ivask.

The center has a gallery for the display of over 50 works of Russian art from the collection that was donated to the college by Thomas P. Whitney.

External links
Amherst Center for Russian Culture

Amherst College
Libraries in Massachusetts
Art museums and galleries in Massachusetts
Museums in Hampshire County, Massachusetts
University museums in Massachusetts
Russian-American culture in Massachusetts
Russian art
Ethnic museums in Massachusetts
Museums established in 1991
Libraries in Hampshire County, Massachusetts
Buildings and structures in Amherst, Massachusetts
1991 establishments in Massachusetts